A Kansan is a native resident of the State of Kansas. Kansan may also refer to:
 Kansan glaciation
 List of Kansan people
 University Daily Kansan, the student newspaper of the University of Kansas
 AT-11 Kansan and SNB-1 Kansan, military and naval variants respectively of the Beechcraft Model 18 twin engine airplane

See also 
 Hanshan (poet)